Barbara Sykes may refer to:
 Barbara Sykes (politician)
 Barbara Sykes (artist)